Erikson Spinola Lima (born 5 July 1995), better known as Nenass, is a Cape Verdean footballer who plays as a midfielder for AaFK.

Career

In 2014, Nenass trialed for MFF, Sweden's most successful club.

Before the 2016 season, he signed for Vålerenga 2 in the Norwegian third division.

In 2016, he signed for Norwegian second division side KFUM Oslo.

In 2017, Nenass signed for Sarpsborg in the Norwegian top flight, where he made 1 league appearance. On 17 September 2017, he debuted for Sarpsborg during a 0-5 loss to TIL.

Before the 2018 season, he signed for Norwegian second division team AaFK, helping them achieve promotion to the Norwegian top flight.

International career
Nenass debuted with the Cape Verde national team in a 2–1 2022 FIFA World Cup qualification win over Liberia on 7 October 2021.

References

External links

 
 

Living people
1995 births
Cape Verdean footballers
Cape Verde international footballers
Association football midfielders
Eliteserien players
Norwegian First Division players
Aalesunds FK players
Sarpsborg 08 FF players
KFUM-Kameratene Oslo players
Cape Verdean expatriate footballers
Cape Verdean expatriate sportspeople in Norway
Expatriate footballers in Norway
2021 Africa Cup of Nations players